Martin Ponsiluoma  (born 8 September 1995) is a Swedish biathlete who competes internationally.

He participated in the 2018 Winter Olympics.

He ended up on a World Cup podium position for first time when he came third during competitions in Nové Město na Moravě, Czech Republic on 20 December 2018. In the 2021 World Championships, he won gold in the sprint, which was also his first world cup win.

Personal life
Ponsiluoma's father, Jyrki Ponsiluoma, is a Finnish-born Swedish former cross-country skier. He has been in a relationship with fellow biathlete Hanna Öberg since 2021.

Biathlon results
All results are sourced from the International Biathlon Union.

Olympic Games
1 medals (1 silver)

World Championships
5 medals (1 gold, 2 silver, 2 bronze)

*During Olympic seasons competitions are only held for those events not included in the Olympic program.
**The single mixed relay was added as an event in 2019.

World Cup

Overall standings

Individual podiums
 2 victories 
 12 podiums

Team podiums
3 victories 
10 podiums

References

External links

1995 births
Living people
Swedish male biathletes
Olympic biathletes of Sweden
Biathletes at the 2018 Winter Olympics
Biathletes at the 2022 Winter Olympics
People from Östersund
Swedish people of Finnish descent
Biathlon World Championships medalists
Medalists at the 2022 Winter Olympics
Olympic medalists in biathlon
Olympic silver medalists for Sweden